Judgement is the fifth album by the British rock band Anathema. It was released on 25 June 1999 through Music for Nations.

Background

The first album with Dave Pybus joining the band to replace bassist and co-principle songwriter Duncan Patterson. Danny Cavanagh now taking on a larger share of the songwriting duties to compensate for Patterson's departure. It is also the band's first album featuring original drummer John Douglas since his return in 1998. John's sister Lee appears for the first time on this album, albeit in a guest role. She would later become the band's third lead vocalist.

Track listing

Personnel

 Vincent Cavanagh – vocals, guitars
 John Douglas – drums
 Dave Pybus – bass
 Danny Cavanagh – guitars, keyboards, vocals on "Parisienne Moonlight"

Guest musicians
 Dario Patti – piano on "Anyone, Anywhere"
 Lee Douglas – female vocals on "Parisienne Moonlight" and "Don't Look Too Far"

Production
 Darren J. White – photography
 Mez – layout
 Dario (Ki-Nell) Mollo – engineering assistant, band photography
 Kit Woolven – producer, engineering
 Rog Sargent – photography

Notes
"One Last Goodbye" is dedicated to Helen Cavanagh (1949–1998), mother of the Cavanagh brothers.

Charts

References

1999 albums
Anathema (band) albums
Music for Nations albums